Leibnitz is a town in the Austrian state of Styria.

Leibnitz may also refer to:

 Gottfried Wilhelm Leibniz (1646–1716), German polymath
 Wolfgang Leibnitz (born 1936), German classical pianist
 Leibnitz (crater), a lunar crater
 Leibnitz District, Styria, Austria
 Leibnitz, a parish in Westmoreland County, New South Wales

See also 
 Leibniz (disambiguation)